Matthias Schulz (born 13 September 1963) is a retired German football midfielder and later manager.

References

1963 births
Living people
German footballers
Dynamo Dresden players
BSG Stahl Riesa players
Dresdner SC players
DDR-Oberliga players
Association football midfielders
German football managers
Dresdner SC managers
Chemnitzer FC managers
Dynamo Dresden non-playing staff
Footballers from Dresden